The Golden Quadrilateral (abbreviated GQ) is a national highway network connecting several major industrial, agricultural and cultural centres of India. It forms a quadrilateral with all the four major metro cities of India forming the vertices, viz., Delhi (north), Kolkata (east), Mumbai (west) and Chennai (south). Other major cities connected by this network include Ahmedabad, Bengaluru, Balasore, Bhadrak, Bhubaneswar, Cuttack, Berhampur, Durgapur, Guntur, Jaipur, Kanpur, Pune, Kolhapur, Surat, Vijayawada, Eluru, Ajmer, Vizag, Bodhgaya, Varanasi, Prayagraj, Agra, Mathura, Dhanbad, Gandhinagar, Udaipur, and Vadodara. The main objective of these super highways is to reduce the travel time between the major cities of India, running roughly along the perimeter of the country. The North–South corridor linking Srinagar (Jammu and Kashmir) and Kanyakumari (Tamil Nadu), and East–West corridor linking Silchar (Assam) and Porbandar (Gujarat) are additional projects. These highway projects are implemented by the National Highway Authority Of India (NHAI). At , it is the largest highway project in India and the fifth longest in the world. The project was planned in 1999, launched in 2001, and was completed in July 2013.

The Golden Quadrilateral project is managed by the National Highways Authority of India (NHAI) under the Ministry of Road, Transport and Highways. The vast majority of the system is not access controlled, although safety features such as guardrails, shoulders, and high-visibility signs are in use. The Mumbai–Pune Expressway, the first controlled-access toll road to be built in India, is a part of the GQ Project but not funded by NHAI, and is separate from the old Mumbai–Pune section of National Highway 48 (India). Infrastructure Leasing & Financial Services (IL&FS) has been one of the major contributors to the infrastructural development activity in the GQ project.

History and costs 

The Golden Quadrilateral Project (GQ Project) was intended to establish faster transport networks between major cities and ports, provide smaller towns better access to markets, reduce agricultural spoilage in transport, drive economical growth, and promote truck transport.

Prime Minister Atal Bihari Vajpayee laid the foundation stone for the project on 6 January 1999. It was planned to be completed by 2006, but there were delays due to land acquisition constraints and disputes with contractors which had to be renegotiated.

India's government had initially estimated that the Golden Quadrilateral project would cost  at 1999 prices. However, the highway was built under-budget. The eight contracts in progress, as of August 2011, were worth .

In January 2012, India announced the four-lane GQ highway network as complete. In September 2009, it was announced that the existing four-laned highways would be converted into six-lane highways. Sections of NH 2, NH 4, NH 5 and NH 8 were prioritized for widening to six lanes under DBFO (Design, Build, Finance, Operate) pattern and more sections would be six-laned in the future. On NH 8 six-lane work was completed from Vadodara to Surat.

Route 

Only National Highways are used in the Golden Quadrilateral. The four legs use the following National Highways (new numbering system):

 Delhi – Kolkata: NH 44 from Delhi to Agra & NH 19 from Agra to Kolkata
 Delhi – Mumbai – Chennai: NH 48
 Kolkata – Chennai: NH 16

Connected cities

Length in each state 

The completed Golden Quadrilateral passes through 12 states and a union territory:

 Andhra Pradesh – 
 Uttar Pradesh – 
 Rajasthan – 
 Karnataka – 
 Maharashtra – 
 Gujarat – 
 Odisha – 
 West Bengal – 
 Tamil Nadu – 
 Bihar – 
 Jharkhand – 
 Haryana – 
 Delhi – 
 Total –

Corruption allegations 

In August 2003, Jharkhand-based project director Satyendra Dubey, in a letter to the prime minister, outlined a list of bad faith (mala fide) actions in a segment of a highway in Bihar. Dubey's claims included that big contractors had inside information from NHAI officials, that the contractors for this stretch were not executing the project themselves (as stipulated in the contract) but had been subcontracting the work to small builders who lacked technical expertise, and that no follow-up was performed after awarding advances. Dubey's name was leaked by the prime minister's office to the NHAI, and he was transferred against his wishes to Gaya, Bihar, where he was murdered on 27 November.

The NHAI eventually admitted that Dubey's allegations were substantiated, and implemented "radical reforms" in the selection and contract procedures. After considerable Central Bureau of Investigation scrutiny, Mantu Kumar and three accomplices were arrested and charged with murder.  Mantu escaped from court on 19 September 2005, but was recaptured a month later.  In 2010, Mantu and two others were convicted of murder and other offenses and sentenced to life in prison.

See also 

 Similar rail development
 Future of rail transport in India, rail development

 Similar roads development
 Bharatmala
 Diamond Quadrilateral, Subsumed in Bharatmala
 National Highways Development Project, Subsumed in Bharatmala
 North-South and East-West Corridor, Subsumed in Bharatmala
 India-China Border Roads, Subsumed in Bharatmala
 Expressways of India
 Setu Bharatam, river road bridge development in India

 Similar ports and river transport development
 Indian Rivers Inter-link
 List of National Waterways in India
 Sagar Mala project, national water port development connectivity scheme

 Similar air transport development
 Indian Human Spaceflight Programme
 UDAN, national airport development connectivity scheme

 Highways in India
 List of National Highways in India by highway number
 List of National Highways in India

 General
 Transport in India

References

Further reading
 Fast Lane to the Future, Don Belt.  National Geographic, October, 2008.

External links 

 'Mile by Mile, India Paves a Smoother Future' – extremely detailed New York Times article, dated 4 December 2005 (free registration required)
 "Golden Quadrilateral still has miles to go" – Financial Express article dated 26 August 2005
 Official website of the National Highways Authority of India
 Map of GQ progress on the NHAI website
 Ministry of Road Transport

 
Proposed roads in India
Vajpayee administration initiatives
National highways in India
Atal Bihari Vajpayee
1999 establishments in India